St Paul's Church, Knightsbridge, is a Grade II*listed Anglican church of the Anglo-Catholic tradition located at 32a Wilton Place in Knightsbridge, London.

History and architecture
The church was founded in 1843, the first in London to champion the ideals of the Oxford Movement, during the incumbency of the Rev. W. J. E. Bennett. The architect was Thomas Cundy the younger.

After the building's consecration in 1843, the chancel with its rood screen and striking reredos was added in 1892 by the noted church architect George Frederick Bodley, who also decorated St Luke's chapel, which stands in the place of a lady chapel to the south of the sanctuary, the lady chapel of St Paul's having traditionally been seen as being the church of St Mary's, Bourne Street.

The tiled panels around the walls of the nave, created in the 1870s by Daniel Bell, depict scenes from the life of Jesus. The stations of the cross that intersperse the tiled panels, painted in the early 1920s by Gerald Moira, show scenes from the crucifixion story. The font dates from 1842 and is carved with biblical scenes from both the Old and New Testaments. There are statues of the Virgin and Child (1896) above the entrance to the chapel, and of St Paul (1902) above the lectern.

A memorial in the church commemorates 52 members of the First Aid Nursing Yeomanry who died on active service during the Second World War while carrying out secret intelligence work for the Special Operations Executive in occupied countries in addition to providing transport drivers for the Auxiliary Territorial Service. Among the names on the memorial are three holders of the George Cross.

St Paul's sister parish is the Church of St. Paul's, K street, in Washington, D.C., in the United States.

Notable events

Weddings
  
15 January 1857: Sir Edward Colebrooke, 4th Baronet, and Elizabeth Richardson
28 November 1865: Rev. Basil Wilberforce and Charlotte Langford
13 February 1884: George Osborne (later 10th Duke of Leeds) and Katherine Lambton
9 February 1886: Ailwyn Fellowes (later 1st Baron Ailwyn) and Agatha Joliffe
19 October 1886: Evelyn Boscawen (later 7th Viscount Falmouth) and Kathleen Douglas-Pennant
1 November 1894: James Hamilton (later 3rd Duke of Abercorn) and Rosalind Bingham
28 July 1900: George Cornwallis-West and Jennie Churchill (née Jerome; mother of Winston Churchill)
30 April 1902: Julian Byng (later 1st Viscount Byng of Vimy) and Evelyn Moreton
25 July 1905: George Montagu (later 9th Earl of Sandwich) and Alberta Sturges
29 November 1909: Charles Beresford Fulke Greville, 3rd Baron Greville and Olive Kerr
19 January 1916: Lieutenant (later Admiral) Frederic Wake-Walker and Muriel Elsie Hughes
2 January 1946: Bruce Shand and Rosalind Cubitt (parents of Camilla, Queen Consort)
3 February 1977: Charles Wellesley (later 9th Duke of Wellington) and Princess Antonia of Prussia

Funerals and memorial services
1937: J. Bruce Ismay
1985: Rev. Walter Hussey
2007: Mark Birley
2012: Angharad Rees
 2017: The Countess Mountbatten of Burma

Gallery

References

External links

Diocese of London
A Church Near You

1843 establishments in England
19th-century Church of England church buildings
Anglo-Catholic church buildings in London
Knightsbridge
Knightsbridge
Churches completed in 1843
Diocese of London
Grade II* listed churches in the City of Westminster
Knightsbridge
Thomas Cundy (junior) church buildings